Soul Grabber is an album by saxophonist Willis Jackson which was recorded in 1967 and released on the Prestige label.

Reception 

Allmusic awarded the album 3 stars.

Track listing 
All compositions by Willis Jackson except where noted.
 "The Song Of Ossahna" (Vinícius de Moraes, Baden Powell) – 2:40
 "Sunny" (Bobby Hebb) – 6:30
 "Girl Talk" (Neal Hefti, Bobby Troup) – 5:20
 "Ode to Billie Joe" (Bobbie Gentry) – 2:50
 "Sometimes I'm Happy" (Vincent Youmans, Irving Caesar) – 5:10
 "Soul Grabber" – 2:00
 "Rhode Island Red" – 3:30
 "Alfie" (Burt Bacharach, Hal David) – 8:18
 "I Dig Rock And Roll Music" (Paul Stookey, Jim Mason, Dave Dixon) – 2:45
 "These Blues are Made for Walking" – 5:40
Recorded in New York City on October 20, 1967 (tracks 1, 4, 9 & 10) and at Van Gelder Studio in Englewood Cliffs, New Jersey on October 25, 1967 (tracks 2, 3 & 5–8)

Personnel 
Willis Jackson – tenor saxophone
Wilbur Bascomb, Sammy Lowe – trumpet
Haywood Henry – baritone saxophone (tracks 1, 4, 9 & 10)
Carl Wilson – organ
Lloyd Davis, Wally Richardson – guitar
Bob Bushnell – electric bass
Lawrence Wrice – drums

References 

Willis Jackson (saxophonist) albums
1967 albums
Prestige Records albums
Albums recorded at Van Gelder Studio
Albums produced by Cal Lampley